The Indiana Philosophical Association (IPA) is an organization founded in 1931 for the purpose of promoting philosophy in the state of Indiana, USA. The IPA is affiliated with the Central Division of the American Philosophical Association, and sponsors meetings semiannually at colleges and universities in Indiana.

References

External links 
IPA website

Organizations based in Indiana
Philosophical societies in the United States